The Rural Municipality of Clayton No. 333 is a rural municipality (RM) in the Canadian province of Saskatchewan within Census Division No. 9 and  Division No. 4.

History 
The RM of Clayton No. 333 incorporated as a rural municipality on January 1, 1913.

Geography

Communities and localities 
The following urban municipalities are surrounded by the RM.

Towns
 Norquay

Villages
 Hyas

The following unincorporated communities are within the RM.

Organized hamlets
 Swan Plain

Localities
 Arabella
 Danbury
 Stenen

Demographics 

Attractions 
 Sturgis Station House Museum
 Fort Pelly National Historic Site
 Prairie National Wildlife Area
 Sturgis & District Regional Park

Government 
The RM of Clayton No. 333 is governed by an elected municipal council and an appointed administrator that meets on the second Wednesday of every month. The reeve of the RM is Duane Hicks while its administrator is Rhonda Bellefeuille. The RM's office is located in Hyas.

Transportation 
 Saskatchewan Highway 8
 Saskatchewan Highway 9
 Saskatchewan Highway 49
 Saskatchewan Highway 650
 Saskatchewan Highway 662
 Saskatchewan Highway 753
 Canadian National Railway

See also 
List of rural municipalities in Saskatchewan

References 

C

Division No. 9, Saskatchewan